The Amazing Maurice is a 2022 computer-animated fantasy comedy film directed by Toby Genkel and co-directed by Florian Westermann from a screenplay by Terry Rossio, based on the 2001 novel The Amazing Maurice and His Educated Rodents by Terry Pratchett. The film stars Hugh Laurie, Emilia Clarke, David Thewlis, Himesh Patel, Gemma Arterton, Joe Sugg, Ariyon Bakare, Julie Atherton, Rob Brydon, Hugh Bonneville and David Tennant. The story follows Maurice, a streetwise ginger cat who befriends a group of talking rats by coming up with a money-making scam.

An animated film adaptation of Pratchett's novel was announced in June 2019, with Rossio writing the screenplay. Most of the lead cast members were hired in November 2020, with additional cast being added in May 2021. Animation was provided by Studio Rakete and Red Star 3D. 

The Amazing Maurice had its premiere at the Manchester Animation Festival on 13 November 2022, and was released in the United Kingdom on 16 December, by Sky Cinema. It was released on 3 February 2023 by Viva Pictures in the United States. The film received generally positive reviews from critics.

Plot
Maurice tells a town of people that they have a plague of rats, illustrated by various rats terrorizing the townsfolk and convinces them to pay for Keith, the pied piper, to lead them outside of the town. Outside the town, the rats are revealed to be sentient and literate, working with Keith and Maurice to defraud towns.

They are heading to the town of Bad Blintz next which suffers from a lack of food and where rat catchers have been unable to find the reason of the disappearing food. Trying to infiltrate the tunnels under the city, the rats notice that there are no local rats despite traces of them. They find a trap that captures rats alive and Darktan, their leader, is trapped inside. Meanwhile, Maurice has entered the mayor's house and when Keith tries to find him, they meet the mayor's daughter, Malicia, who quickly deduces - after seeing tap-dancing rat Sardines - that they are behind the recent plague of rats in nearby towns and enlists them to help discover the reason behind the city's food shortage.

Their quest leads them to the local rat catchers headquarters where they find a secret passage to the basement filled with food. They also find Darktan and the other rats coming from the tunnels with the trap they found. Maurice correctly guesses that the rat catchers are trying to catch the rats alive to use them for entertainment, pitting dogs in rings with rats and betting on how fast they are killed. The rat catchers catch Sardines and use him for the ring but he is rescued by the others.

Poisoning the food with laxatives, Maurice, Keith and Malicia manage to force the rat catchers to admit that they created a rat king when eight rats they left in a bucket got their tails knotted and developed an evil sentience, capable of controlling other rats. Maurice flees from the rat king while Keith and Malicia head to the woods to find the real pied piper and steal his magical flute, the only instrument known to kill a rat king. Meanwhile, the Big Boss, revealed to be the rat king in a pile of human clothes, has captured Peaches, one of the rats, and Dangerous Beans, the group's spiritual leader, tries to rescue her. Confronting the rat king in the rat catchers' office, Maurice appears and hits him with the money they swindled, allowing him to escape with the two rats. 

In the woods, Keith and Malicia attempt to steal the flute from the sleeping piper but he wakes up and tries to kill them by forcing them to enter the burning oven. They are saved when the wind-up toy mouse Malicia previously took from Darktan distracts him long enough to lose the flute, allowing them to run back to town with the flute.

Meanwhile, Maurice and the rats try to flee the city but are stopped by the rat king who summons dozens of rats from all directions to make himself stronger. Maurice runs into the woods to find the two humans while the rats are attempting to resist the rat king's call to merge with him. Keith and Malicia return and after some initial hurdles, he manages to play the flute correctly to beguile the rats away from the rat king's influence until only the king itself remains. The rat king uses the last of his power to freeze everyone in place but Dangerous Beans manages to break free, defying him again. The rat king then telepathically snaps his neck. Laying dying, Dangerous Beans reminds Maurice to be a cat and he uses his bottled up instincts to attack and kill the rat king, mortally wounding himself in the process. When Death and the Death of Rats arrive to take Dangerous Beans and one of Maurice's lives, he successfully trades one of his lives for Dangerous Beans' life, allowing both of them to wake up. Malicia and Keith, also start a relationship as they developed feelings for each other over the course of their adventure.

With the rat king defeated and the food given back to the townspeople, the town and the rats come to an agreement. The rats get to live in the middle of town and Bad Blintz becomes a tourist attraction with its talking rats, including a job for Keith as the town's official piper.

Voice cast
 Hugh Laurie as Maurice
 Emilia Clarke as Malicia 
 David Thewlis as Boss Man
 Himesh Patel as Keith
 Gemma Arterton as Peaches
 Hugh Bonneville as The Mayor
 David Tennant as Dangerous Beans
 Rob Brydon as The Pied Piper
 Julie Atherton as Nourishing
 Joe Sugg as Sardines
 Peter Serafinowicz as Death
 Jerry Hoffmann  as	Keith 
 Murali Perumal as	Gefährliche Bohnen

Production
In June 2019, the adaptation of Terry Pratchett's novel into an animated film was announced. Additionally, Terry Rossio was stated to be the screenplay writer, Carter Goodrich the concept character designer, Toby Genkel the film's director, and Julia Stuart of SKY, Rob Wilkins of Narrativia, Emely Christians, Robert Chandler and Andrew Baker as producers. In October 2019, sales for the film began and art work from the production was released. The voice cast of Hugh Laurie, Emilia Clarke, David Thewlis, Himesh Patel, Gemma Arterton and Hugh Bonneville was announced in November 2020. David Tennant, Rob Brydon, Julie Atherton and Joe Sugg were added to the voice cast in May 2021.

Music
On 6 April 2021, Tom Howe was announced to composed the film's musical score.

Release
The Amazing Maurice had its premiere at the Manchester Animation Festival on 13 November 2022, and was released in United Kingdom on 16 December, by Sky Cinema. It is set to be released in the United States by Viva Pictures on 3 February 2023, after being delayed from a 13 January 2023 release. It had its American premiere at the 2023 Sundance Film Festival.

Home media
The Amazing Maurice will be released on DVD and Blu-ray by Dazzler Media on 10 April 2023.

Reception

Box office
, The Amazing Maurice has grossed $4 million in the United States and Canada, and $15.2 million in other territories, for a worldwide total of $19.2 million.

Critical response
Review aggregator website Rotten Tomatoes reports that 73% of 48 sampled critics gave the film a positive review, with an average rating of 6.2/10. The site's critical consensus reads, "You may not necessarily need to rush out and see it right meow, but The Amazing Maurice is a solid book adaptation that makes for fun family viewing."

References

External links

 

2022 films
2022 3D films
2022 comedy films
2022 fantasy films
2022 computer-animated films
2020s British animated films
2020s German animated films
2020s children's comedy films
2020s children's fantasy films
2020s children's animated films
2020s fantasy comedy films
2020s English-language films
British 3D films
British computer-animated films
British children's comedy films
British animated fantasy films
British fantasy comedy films
German 3D films
German computer-animated films
German children's comedy films
German animated fantasy films
German fantasy comedy films
Animated comedy films
Metafictional works
Discworld films and television series
3D animated films
English-language German films
Animated films based on British novels
Animated films based on children's books
Films based on Pied Piper of Hamelin
Animated films about cats
Animated films about rats
Films about pets
Animated films about orphans
Films set on fictional planets
Films directed by Toby Genkel
Films with screenplays by Terry Rossio
Films postponed due to the COVID-19 pandemic
Films impacted by the COVID-19 pandemic